Westwind or West Wind may refer to:

Transportation 
 IAI Westwind, a business jet
 Westwind (Honduran presidential plane), an IAI Westwind used as the Honduras Presidential Plane
 Westwind, a call sign for West Wind Aviation, an aviation company based in Saskatoon 
 USCGC Westwind (WAGB-281), a decommissioned ice breaker that served the United States Coast Guard

Media and music 
 Westwind (band), a French post-industrial band
 Westwind (TV series), broadcast on NBC in the mid-1970s
 West Wind Records, jazz record label
 Westwind (film), a 2011 German comedy film
 Westwind (novel), a 1990 novel by Ian Rankin
 Westwind: Djalu's Legacy, film about Djalu Gurruwiwi
Bärra West Wind, band led by two of Djalu's sons.

Other 
 Westwind Drift, or the Antarctic Circumpolar Current, an ocean current
 YWCA Camp Westwind, a summer camp on the Oregon Coast
 WestWind Energy, a wind farm development company

See also 
 West wind (disambiguation)